Hendrix Lapierre (born February 9, 2002) is a Canadian professional ice hockey centre for the Hershey Bears of the American Hockey League (AHL) as a prospect to the Washington Capitals of the National Hockey League (NHL). Lapierre was selected 22nd overall by the Capitals in the 2020 NHL Entry Draft.

Playing career
On October 6, 2020, Lapierre was selected by the Washington Capitals with the 22nd overall pick in the 2020 NHL Entry Draft. He was signed to a three-year, entry-level contract with the Capitals on October 27, 2020.

Following his third season of major junior hockey with the Chicoutimi Saguenéens of the Quebec Major Junior Hockey League (QMJHL), Lapierre was traded to Acadie–Bathurst Titan in exchange for two junior players and four draft selections on June 23, 2021.

Lapierre made his NHL debut for the Capitals on October 13, 2021, at home against the New York Rangers. He scored his first NHL goal in the second period of that game on an assist from T. J. Oshie.

Career statistics

Regular season and playoffs

International

Awards and honours

References

External links
 

2002 births
Living people
Acadie–Bathurst Titan players
Canadian ice hockey centres
Chicoutimi Saguenéens (QMJHL) players
Hershey Bears players
Ice hockey people from Gatineau
National Hockey League first-round draft picks
Washington Capitals draft picks
Washington Capitals players